The 1974–75 Divizia C was the 19th season of Liga III, the third tier of the Romanian football league system.

Team changes

To Divizia C
Relegated from Divizia B
 Viitorul Vaslui
 Caraimanul Bușteni
 Petrolul Moinești
 Victoria Roman
 Minerul Motru
 Carpați Brașov
 Nitramonia Făgăraș
 Dunărea Giurgiu
 Olimpia Oradea
 Minerul Cavnic
 Textila Odorheiu Secuiesc
 Gloria Bistrița

Promoted from County Championship
 Laminorul Roman
 Foresta Moldovița
 Recolta Văleni
 Partizanul Bacău
 Petrolul Teleajen Ploiești
 Dinamo Focșani
 Mecanizatorul Târgu Bujor
 Dunărea Cernavodă
 Recolta Frecăței
 IPRECA Călărași
 Automatica București
 Viitorul Scornicești
 Oțelul Târgoviște
 Progresul Băilești
 Dinamo Orșova
 Ceramica Jimbolia
 Minerul Oravița
 Voința Oradea
 CM Cluj-Napoca
 Minerul Băiuț
 Unirea Tășnad
 Inter Sibiu
 Minerul Baraolt
 Măgura Codlea

From Divizia C
Promoted to Divizia B
 Foresta Fălticeni
 Relonul Săvinești
 Unirea Focșani
 Chimia Brăila
 Voința București
 Automatica Alexandria
 Victoria Călan
 Minerul Moldova Nouă
 Metalul Aiud
 Minerul Baia Sprie
 Oltul Sfântu Gheorghe
 CSU Brașov

Relegated to County Championship
 Victoria PTTR Botoșani
 ITA Iași
 Foresta Gugești
 Locomotiva Adjud
 Portul Brăila
 Carpați Nehoiu
 Constructorul Tulcea
 Arrubium Măcin
 Argeșul Mihăilești
 Sportul Ciorogârla
 Aro Câmpulung
 Petrolul Videle
 Metalul Topleț
 Petrolul Țicleni
 Furnirul Deta
 Gloria Arad
 Tehnofrig Cluj-Napoca
 Someșul Beclean
 Gloria Baia Mare
 Măgura Șimleu Silvaniei
 Mureșul Toplița
 Hebe Sângeorz-Băi
 Carpați Mârșa
 Oltul Râmnicu Vâlcea

Renamed teams
Trotușul Gheorghiu-Dej was renamed as Carom Gheorghiu-Dej.

Recolta Văleni was renamed as Tractorul Văleni before of the start of second part.

Mecanizatorul Târgu Bujor was renamed as Bujorii Târgu Bujor.

Dinamo Slobozia was renamed as Voința Slobozia.

Răsăritul Caracal was renamed as Vagonul Caracal.

Energia Rovinari was renamed as Minerul Rovinari.

AS Bocșa was renamed as Metalul Bocșa.

Unirea Zalău was renamed as Armătura Zalău.

Topitorul Baia Mare was renamed as Cuprom Baia Mare.

Textila Odorheiu Secuiesc was renamed as Progresul Odorheiu Secuiesc.

League tables

Seria I

Seria II

Seria III

Seria IV

Seria V

Seria VI

Seria VII

Seria VIII

Seria IX

Seria X

Seria XI

Seria XII

See also 
 1974–75 Divizia A
 1974–75 Divizia B

References 

Liga III seasons
3
Romania